Bade Achche Lagte Hain is a Hindi song from the Indian film Balika Badhu (1976). Actor Sachin Pilgaonkar is seen in the picturisation of the song. Amit Kumar sang it under R. D. Burman's tune. The song became #26th song at the annual top chart of Binaca Geetmala.

References

1976 songs
Hindi-language songs
Indian songs
Amit Kumar songs
Indian film songs
Songs with music by R. D. Burman
Songs with lyrics by Anand Bakshi